Fulks Run is an unincorporated community located in Rockingham County, Virginia, United States. It is located north of Harrisonburg and south of Bergton just to the west of Broadway on route 259, near the border of West Virginia and the edge of George Washington National Forest. The North Fork Shenandoah River flows past the community. It includes Fulks Run Elementary School. The Fulks Run Ruritan Park is a popular get together spot with a baseball field.

Fulks Run would have been inundated by the reservoir of the Brocks Gap Dam, proposed in the 1940s and 1960s. Determined local opposition defeated the dam project.

References

Unincorporated communities in Rockingham County, Virginia
Unincorporated communities in Virginia